Furlan is an Italian surname. Notable people with the surname include:

Alan Furlan (1920–1997), American actor
Alessio Furlan (born 1976), Italian boxer
Angelo Furlan (born 1977), Argentine cyclist
Annamaria Furlan
Boris Furlan (1894–1957), Slovenian jurist, philosopher of law, translator and politician
Brittany Furlan
Bruno Furlan (born 1992), Brazilian footballer
Federico Furlan (born 1990), Italian footballer
Gabriel Furlán (born 1964), Argentine racing driver
Giorgio Furlan (born 1966), Italian cyclist
Jean-Marc Furlan (born 1957), French footballer and manager
Jovani Furlan, Brazilian ballet dancer
Luis Furlán (born 1948), Guatemalan electrical engineer
Mira Furlan (born 1955), Croatian actress and singer
Renzo Furlan (born 1970), Italian tennis player
Sergio Furlan (born 1940), Italian sailor
Brittany Furlan (born 1986), American comedian and internet personality

Surnames of Italian origin